Tayahua is a small provincial town in the central Mexican state of Zacatecas. The town has less than 2,193  inhabitants. Tayahua is a municipality of the city Villanueva. It is located West of Villanueva and East of the City Tabasco. Antonio Aguilar and family once lived in La Hacienda by the Catholic Church in Tayahua.

Climate

External links
Pagina De Tayahua Mi Tayahua

References

One of Tayahua's homepages by Servando Vera

Populated places in Zacatecas